The Vampire Diaries, an American supernatural drama, was officially renewed for a third season by The CW on April 26, 2011, that aired from September 15, 2011, to May 10, 2012. The third season consisted of 22 episodes and focused on the story of Klaus' origin, his relation with his family and reveal more about the original family. The third season opened to generally positive reviews. The season takes a gap from the last season and begins with Elena Gilbert's 18th birthday with all series regulars returning with the exception of Sara Canning whose character Jenna Sommers was killed off in the previous season. Joseph Morgan's character Klaus became a series regular instead of returning as a recurring character.

Cast

Main

Nina Dobrev as Elena Gilbert / Katherine Pierce
Paul Wesley as Stefan Salvatore
Ian Somerhalder as Damon Salvatore
Steven R. McQueen as Jeremy Gilbert
Kat Graham as Bonnie Bennett
Zach Roerig as Matt Donovan
Candice Accola as Caroline Forbes
Michael Trevino as Tyler Lockwood 
Matt Davis as Alaric Saltzman
Joseph Morgan as Niklaus Mikaelson

Recurring

Claire Holt as Rebekah Mikaelson
Susan Walters as Carol Lockwood
Torrey DeVitto as Meredith Fell
Marguerite MacIntyre as Liz Forbes
Daniel Gillies as Elijah Mikaelson
Alice Evans as Esther
Sebastian Roché as Mikael
Persia White as Abby Bennett Wilson
Kayla Ewell as Vicki Donovan
Malese Jow as Anna
Nathaniel Buzolic as Kol Mikaelson
Casper Zafer as Finn Mikaelson
Jack Coleman as Bill Forbes

Guest

Robert Ri'chard as Jamie Wilson
Cassidy Freeman as Sage
 Kimberly Drummond as Mindy
David Gallagher as Ray Sutton
Taylor Kinney as Mason Lockwood
Zane Stephens as Tony
Daniel Newman as Daniel Warren
Kelly Hu as Pearl
Arielle Kebbel as Lexi Branson
Jasmine Guy as Sheila Bennett
Stephen Martines as Frederick
Dawn Olivieri as Andie Starr
 Cherilyn Wilson as Sofie
Lauren Cohan as Rose
Sara Canning as Jenna Sommers

Episodes

Production 
On April 26, 2011, The CW officially renewed The Vampire Diaries for a third season. On May 19, 2011, with the reveal of The CW's 2011-12 schedule, it was announced the series would stay on Thursday's at 8:00 pm Eastern/7:00 pm Central as a lead-in to The Secret Circle which is also produced by Kevin Williamson. Kevin Williamson, Julie Plec, Leslie Morgenstein and Bob Levy are executive producers for the series.

The third season premiered on Thursday, September 15, 2011.

Casting 
The series stars Nina Dobrev as Elena Gilbert and Katherine Pierce, Paul Wesley as Stefan Salvatore, Ian Somerhalder as Damon Salvatore, Steven R. McQueen as Jeremy Gilbert, Kat Graham as Bonnie Bennett, Candice Accola as Caroline Forbes, Zach Roerig as Matt Donovan, Michael Trevino as Tyler Lockwood, Matt Davis as Alaric Saltzman and Joseph Morgan as Klaus.

7th Heaven's David Gallagher was cast as werewolf Ray Sutton who has a run-in with Klaus in Tennessee. Australian actress, Claire Holt has been cast as Rebekah the sister of Klaus and Elijah, a beautiful vampire who had the pleasure of Stefan's company back in the early days when he was feasting on human blood. Sebastian Roché has also been cast as Mikael a vampire hunter, who is more specifically after his son Klaus. He feeds on vampires and is hunting Klaus. It is later revealed that he is the father of the Originals and Klaus's stepfather. When his plan to kill Klaus backfires, Mikael is killed by Klaus instead. Heroes star Jack Coleman was cast as Bill, a former resident of Mystic Falls and the father of resident vampire Caroline, who first believes his daughter has become a monster, but later accepts her.

Alice Evans joined the cast as the original witch Esther, Klaus' mother. She was first seen in a flashback in episode eight. Daniel Gillies will also return first appearing in a flashback during episode eight as Klaus' brother, Elijah. Persia White has been cast as Bonnie's mother, Abby Bennett. On November 10, 2011, it was announced that Paul Wesley's wife Torrey DeVitto was cast as Meredith Fell (based on Meredith Sulez from the source novel), a young doctor who is fascinated by Alaric, when she notices how quickly he recovers from an injury. She uses vampire blood to cure people and starts dating Alaric. On November 16, 2011, it was announced that Robert Ri'chard was cast as Jamie a new love interest for resident witch Bonnie. On November 22, 2011, it was announced that Daniel Newman was cast as Daniel Warren, appearing in one episode. Australian actor Nathaniel Buzolic has been cast to play Klaus and Elijah's brother Kol and English actor Caspar Zafer has been cast as their other brother Finn. On January 13, 2012, it was announced that Cassidy Freeman was cast as Sage. On March 31, 2012, Sara Canning was confirmed to return as Jenna Sommers in a flashback in the last episode of the season, "The Departed". On April 9, 2012, Jason MacDonald and Erin Beute were confirmed as Elena's parents, will appear in a flashback in the last episode of the season. Lauren Cohan re-appeared in the episode 'Heart of Darkness,' as ghost Rose, to contact Jeremy and find Mary, who turned Rose into a vampire.

Storylines 

Season three begins in the aftermath of Jenna's death and the ceremony which leads to the creation of Klaus being the first hybrid. This has heavily affected Alaric, Elena, and Jeremy. Stefan is on a ripper binge where he can not control his urges for human blood, and he continues to become a darker character. In trying to help Stefan, Elena and Damon spend time together and they begin to realize that they have feelings for each other. They both feel guilt over this and do not speak about it, but it is a silent truth between them.

Jeremy is still having trouble with his ghosts; they are trying to convey an important message to him. He and Bonnie are becoming more distant as his past ghosts distract him from his everyday life.

Klaus is intent on creating an army of hybrids (half-vampire, half-werewolf) that are sired to him. At the beginning of the season, Klaus enlists Stefan to help him but Stefan eventually leaves. Alaric becomes a vampire hunter and targets the Originals.

The season also focuses on how the Original family of vampires came to be vampires by their father, Michael Mikaelson, asking Esther to make them stronger than their neighbors who were werewolves. It also delves deeper into the physiology of the family specifically the siblings and shows the reason behind their motto "Always and Forever" and how bonds formed between some of the siblings.

Reception

Critical response
Based on 10 reviews, the 3rd season currently holds a 90% on Rotten Tomatoes with an average rating of 8.7 out of 10. The site's critics consensus reads, "A bloody delight, The Vampire Diaries continues its winning run with its trademark twists, shocking deaths, and consistent character development."

Ratings

DVD and Blu-ray release

References 

3
2011 American television seasons
2012 American television seasons